Anniela (born 3 June 1990) is a Swedish pop singer originally from Rinkaby in Skåne,
but has been living in Stockholm for a few years. Signed to Hitworks, she
released her début album Extravaganza in 2009. She appeared on a talent show TV4 when
she was 13 years old and in various musicals. Her music
can be described as international electro dance pop in English with hints of R&B and she
offers avery visual performance. Annielas debut was released in a number
of foreign countries. In 2011 she participated in Melodifestivalen 2011 with the song Elektrisk, with lyrics in Swedish, which is a first for her. She didn't make it to the final, getting 6th place in the second semi-final.

Discography 
Album
 2009 – Extravaganza
 2011 – Electric
Singles
 2009 – "Strip-teaser"
 2010 – "My Confession"
 2011 – "Elektrisk/Electric"
 2011 – "Sin of my Own"
 2011 – "Party Crusher"

References

1990 births
Living people
Swedish pop singers
Swedish dance musicians
Melodifestivalen contestants
English-language singers from Sweden
21st-century Swedish singers
21st-century Swedish women singers